The 2003 Bathurst 24 Hour was a motor race staged at the Mount Panorama Circuit just outside Bathurst in New South Wales, Australia. The race started at 2:00pm on 22 November 2003 and finished at 2:00pm on 23 November. It was the second Bathurst 24 Hour.

The race featured five car classes and was intended as a showcase for the racing categories promoted by Procar Australia, namely Nations Cup cars, GT Performance Cars and Production Cars. It was also open to various other categories which included FIA Group N-GT and Grand-Am GT. 

The race was won by Peter Brock, Greg Murphy, Jason Bright and Todd Kelly driving a Holden Monaro 427C.

Class structure

Class A
The leading class contained vehicles eligible for international FIA N-GT, American Grand-Am GT and the Australian Nations Cup Group 1 category. It featured BMW M3 GTR, Ferrari 360 N-GT, Mosler MT900R, Porsche 996 GT3-RS, Porsche 996 GT3-RC, Lamborghini Diablo GTR, and the "Nations Cup" version of the Holden Monaro, the 427C

Class B
Consisted of Nations Cup Group 2 cars: Ferrari 360 Modena, Porsche 996 GT3 Cup and international GTs of varying kinds, Morgan Aero 8, Porsche 996 GT3 S and a modified BMW M Coupe.

Class D
A production based class featuring cars from the Australian GT Performance Car Championship. The entry consisted of BMW M Coupe, BMW M3, FPV GT, HSV X Series GTS, Mitsubishi Lancer Evolution VII, Nissan 200SX, Nissan 350Z and Subaru Impreza WRX.

Class E
A production based class featuring cars from the Australian Production Car Championship. The entry consisted of Alfa Romeo 156 GTA, Ford Falcon XR6T, Holden Commodore VY, Honda Integra, Honda S2000 and Toyota Celica SX.

Class F
The class catered for a variety of vehicles which included Future Touring Ford Falcon, Holden VX Commodore & Holden VY Commodore, a Nürburgring VLN series BMW M3, a Supertouring BMW 320i, an old GT-Production BMW M3-R, New Zealand Schedule S touring car Toyota Altezza and Mitsubishi Mirage Cup one-make series cars.

Top 10 Qualifiers
The top 10 qualifiers for the 2003 Bathurst 24 Hour were as follows:

Official results

Results as follows:

References

Statistics
 Pole Position - #427 Garth Tander - 2:13.2856
 Fastest Lap - #427 Garth Tander - 2:14.4894 (lap 524)
 Average Speed - 136 km/h

External links
 Bathurst 24hr - 19th to 23rd November 2003 - Supplementary Regulations, bathurst24hr.com, as archived at web.archive.org
 24hr 2003 - Provisional Entrants List, www.bathurst24hr.com, as archived at web.archive.org
 Bathurst 24hr - Race results, www.procar.com.au, as archived at web.archive.org
 Race results, www.natsoft.com.au, as archived at web.archive.org

Motorsport in Bathurst, New South Wales
Bathurst 24 Hour
Procar Australia